Inesite is a hydrous calcium manganese silicate mineral.  Its chemical formula is Ca2Mn7Si10O28(OH)2•5(H2O).  Inesite is an inosilicate with a triclinic crystal system. It has a Mohs hardness of 5.5 to 6, and a specific gravity of 3.0.  Its name originates from the Greek Ίνες, "fibers" in allusion to its color and habit.

Occurrence and distribution 
Inesite occurs in hydrothermal replacement deposits of manganese-rich metamorphic rocks and serpentines.  It was first described in 1887 at Hilfe Gottes Mine, Oberscheld, Dillenburg, Dillenburg District, Hesse, Germany.  Outside of the type locality, there are several notable localities of inesite, such as:

 Wessels and N'Chwanning Mines, Kalahari Manganese Field, Northern Cape, South Africa where Inesite is associated with datolite, pectolite, apophyllite, ruizite, orientite and quartz.

 Broken Hill, New South Wales, Australia.

 Långban, Persberg, Värmland, Sweden.

 Kawazu Mine, Shizuoka Prefecture, Chubu Region, Honshu Island, Japan

 Hale Creek Mine, Trinity County, California, USA, where Inesite is associated with Rhodochrosite, bementite, and hausmannite.

 Fengjishan Mine (Daye Copper Mine), Edong Mining District, Daye County, Huangshi Prefecture, Hubei Province, China.

References 

Manganese(II) minerals
Inosilicates
Triclinic minerals
Calcium minerals
Minerals in space group 2